Emma Lunatti (born 3 July 1998) is a French rower. She competed in the women's quadruple sculls event at the 2020 Summer Olympics.

References

External links
 

1998 births
Living people
French female rowers
Olympic rowers of France
Rowers at the 2020 Summer Olympics
Place of birth missing (living people)